An inquest is a judicial investigation or inquiry.

Inquest may also refer to:

 Inquest (charity), a UK charity concerned with deaths in custody
 Inquest (play), a 1931 play written by Michael Barringer
 Inquest (1931 British film), based on the play
 Inquest (1939 film), based on the play
 Inquest (1931 German film), a German film directed by Robert Siodmak
The Inquest a short story by Stanislaw Lem, see Inquest of Pilot Pirx

See also
 Da Vinci's Inquest, a long-running Canadian drama
 InQuest Gamer, a discontinued monthly magazine for game reviews and news